Preston High School is the name of several high schools:

In Canada:
 Preston High School (Ontario) in Cambridge, Ontario

In the United Kingdom:
 City of Preston High School in Preston, Lancashire, England

In the United States:
 Preston High School (Idaho) in Preston, Idaho (known as the Napoleon Dynamite high school)
 Preston High School (Iowa) in Preston, Iowa
 Preston High School (Oklahoma) in Preston, Oklahoma
 Preston High School (Maryland), former high school in Preston, Maryland
 Preston High School (New York City) in the Bronx borough of New York City
 Preston High School (West Virginia) in Kingwood, West Virginia, serving Preston County
 Lake Preston High School in Lake Preston, South Dakota

In Australia

 Preston High School (Victoria) in Preston, Victoria (opening 2019)